A janitor is a person who takes care of a building.

Janitor may also be:
 Janitor fish, Pterygoplichthys 
 Janitor Joe,  a DOS game
 Janitor Joe,  an American noise rock band
 Janitor (Scrubs), a character on the NBC television comedy series Scrubs
 Janitors Of Tomorrow, album released by the band Gas Huffer in 1991
 President (game), a card game sometimes known as "Janitor" where players race to get rid of all their cards
 The New Janitor, comedy from Keystone Studios featuring Charlie Chaplin

 The Janitor, also known as Roger, an antagonist in Little Nightmares